Group B of the 1998 Fed Cup Europe/Africa Zone Group I was one of four pools in the Europe/Africa Zone Group I of the 1998 Fed Cup. Four teams competed in a round robin competition, with the top two teams advancing to the knockout stage.

Poland vs. Madagascar

Portugal vs. Great Britain

Poland vs. Great Britain

Portugal vs. Madagascar

Poland vs. Portugal

Great Britain vs. Madagascar

  failed to win any ties in the pool, and thus was relegated to Group II in 1999, where they placed third in their pool of five.

See also
Fed Cup structure

References

External links
 Fed Cup website

1998 Fed Cup Europe/Africa Zone